Olga Kaidantzi (born 17 July 1979) is a Greek sprinter who specialized in 200 metres competitions.

She reached the semi-finals in Athletics at the 2004 Summer Olympics – Women's 200 metres, and was a member of the Greek 4×100 metres relay team which finished sixth in the 2001 World Championships in Athletics along with Georgia Kokloni, Frosso Patsou, and Ekaterini Thanou. She participated in the 2002 European Athletics Championships and made it through the semi-finals.

After a long break (2005–2008) due to various serious injuries, Kaidantzi came back in 2009 to become the best Greek sprinter in the 200 metre event, winning the title of Greek outdoor champion with a time of 23.93 seconds. She is a five-time Greek champion in the 200 metre race (2001, 2002, 2003, 2004 & 2009). Her personal best time since 12 June 2004 is 22.88 seconds. This places her second in the list of all-time Greek performers behind Ekaterini Koffa.

Honours

Personal information 

Place of birth: Athina, Attiki, Greece
Height: 5'8" (172 cm) 
Weight: 128 lbs (58 kg)

Personal bests

Sources 

start list of the final 4x100 relay edmonton 2001 
profile on sports-reference 
profile on segas 
iaaf profile

References

1979 births
Living people
Greek female sprinters
Athletes from Athens
Athletes (track and field) at the 2004 Summer Olympics
Olympic athletes of Greece
Mediterranean Games bronze medalists for Greece
Mediterranean Games medalists in athletics
Athletes (track and field) at the 2001 Mediterranean Games
Olympic female sprinters
21st-century Greek women